Martins Creek railway station is located on the Hunter Line in New South Wales, Australia opening on 14 August 1911. It serves the town of Martins Creek. It is served by NSW TrainLink Hunter line services travelling between Newcastle and Dungog.

Platforms & services
Martins Creek consists of a single platform. The original 1911 weatherboard building was demolished in 2009 and replaced by a waiting shelter.

It is served by NSW TrainLink Hunter line services travelling between Newcastle and Dungog. There are five services in each direction on weekdays, with three on weekends and public holidays.

Opposite the platform is a siding leading to Martins Creek Ballast Quarry. This was sold in December 2012 by RailCorp to the Daracon Group.

References

External links
Martins Creek station details Transport for New South Wales

Easy Access railway stations in New South Wales
Railway stations in the Hunter Region
Railway stations in Australia opened in 1911
Regional railway stations in New South Wales
Short-platform railway stations in New South Wales, 1 car or less